Channel conflict occurs when manufacturers (brands) disintermediate their channel partners, such as distributors, retailers, dealers, and sales representatives, by selling their products directly to consumers through general marketing methods and/or over the Internet.

Some manufacturers want to capture online markets for their brands but do not want to create conflicts with their other distribution channels. The Census Bureau of the U.S. Department of Commerce reported that online sales in 2005 grew 24.6 percent over 2004 to reach 86.3 billion.  By comparison, total retail sales in 2005 grew 7.2 percent from 2004. These numbers made the online marketplace attractive to manufacturers but raised the question of how to participate without harming existing channel relationships.

According to Forrester Research and Gartner from 2007, despite the rapid growth of online commerce, an estimated 90 percent of manufacturers did not sell their products online. Of these, 66 percent identified channel conflict as their single biggest issue. However, results from a survey show that click-and-mortar businesses have an 80% greater chance of sustaining a business model during a three-year period than those operating just in one of the two channels.

E-commerce is the most popular second distribution channel because of its low overhead expenses and communication costs. This advantage is also a disadvantage, since consumers can also communicate less expensively and more easily with one another in the online marketplace. Therefore, price and product differentiation are more challenging in online markets.

Channel conflict can also occur when there has been overproduction. This results in a surplus of products. Newer versions of products, changes in trends, insolvency of wholesalers and retailers, and the distribution of damaged goods also affect channel conflict. In this connection, a company's stock clearance strategy is important.

To avoid a channel conflict in a click-and-mortar business, it is necessary to ensure that both traditional and online channels are fully integrated. This reduces possible confusion with customers while providing the business benefits of a dual channel.

Manufacturers today sell their products through a broad array of channels. Since most manufacturers sell through several channels simultaneously, channels sometimes find themselves competing to reach the same set of customers. When this happens, channel conflict is virtually guaranteed. In turn, such conflict almost invariably finds its way back to the manufacturer.
 
This can also be termed as a situation when a producer or supplier bypasses the normal channel of distribution and sells directly to the end user. Selling over the Internet while maintaining a physical distribution network is an example of channel conflict. 
	
Channel conflict comes in many forms. Some are mild, merely the necessary friction of a competitive business environment. Some are actually positive for the manufacturer, forcing out-of-date or uneconomic players to adapt or decline. Other conflicts, however, can undermine the manufacturer's business model. Such high-risk conflicts generally occur when one channel targets customer segments already served by an existing channel. This leads to such a deterioration of channel economics that the threatened channel either retaliates against the manufacturer or simply stops selling its product. The result is disintermediation, in which the manufacturer suffers.
The two main disintermediation causes are finance and the internet.

Finance 

Elimination of financial intermediaries (banks, brokers) between the suppliers of funds (savers/investors) and the users of funds (borrowers/investees). Disintermediation occurs when inflation rates are high but bank interest rates are stagnant and the bank depositors can get better returns by investing in mutual funds or in securities.

Internet 

Elimination (by the online sources) of the traditional intermediary between the seller and the buyer (such as an agent, broker, or reseller), or between the source and the recipient of information (such as an agency, official, or gatekeeper).

Type of channel conflicts 

There are two types of channel conflicts.

Vertical channel conflicts  
Vertical conflict occurs when a manufacturer's action disrupts the supply chain. For example, a manufacturer who normally distributes its products through retail would cause a vertical channel conflict if they start doing direct mail and advertise directly to consumers.

Horizontal channel conflicts 

Horizontal conflict occurs among firms at the same level of the channel. For example, two franchises who open two restaurants across the street from each other would be in a horizontal conflict or when one firm in a distribution channel offers lower prices than the members of the distribution channel and therefore attract more customers.

So what do the manufacturers have to do? 

Resource dependence theory emphasizes the need for organizations to formulate strategies to enhance their power positions and reduce their environmental dependence in order to achieve sustainable competitiveness. The findings of a research about power-dependence and reseller influence on SME's continued use of online direct sales channels illustrate that to reduce the negative impact of power-dependence imbalance, SMEs should strive to reshape and strengthen their power-dependence position relative to their resellers. For instance, SMEs can strengthen their power-dependence position by providing differentiated service support to better cater to resellers’ needs and by reinforcing their unique values to create mutual dependence between an SME and its resellers. SMEs may also strive to improve their power-dependence position through the improvement of their power among other suppliers of the resellers. Research on power imbalance and power use suggests that a reseller's tolerance level toward a supplier is greatly determined by the supplier's relative power position relative to the reseller's alternative suppliers
On the other hand, recent studies have shown that we have to use retailers in order to provide an integrated journey for the customer to decision because, at the evaluation stage of the Consumer Decision Journey, consumers didn't start with search engines; rather, they went directly to Amazon.com and other retail sites that, with their rich and expanding array of product-comparison information, consumer and expert ratings, and visuals, were becoming the most important influencers.

References 

Brand management
Supply chain management